Springfield (until 1880 Kowai Pass) is a small town in the Selwyn District of Canterbury, in the South Island, of New Zealand. The Maori name for Springfield is Tawera. 

Springfield is situated in the foothills of the Southern Alps as the most westerly town of the Canterbury Plains.

Springfield is one of New Zealand's most underrated ski towns. It is located close to Porters Ski Area, Mount Cheeseman, Broken River, Temple Basin and Craigieburn ski fields.

Springfield has a long association with the Midland railway line.

History 

The development of the town started around 1860. With the discovery of gold on the West Coast, Springfield saw more traffic. The Springfield Hotel was first built in 1862. Rooms were added to it on a number of occasions enlarging the hotel so that it had 40 rooms. The hotel was an important coaching stop on the route to the west coast. 

In the 1870s, water from the nearby Kowai river was used to develop one of the earliest stock water races in Canterbury.

The town has a Gothic Revival architecture church dedicated to Saint Peter, designed by the architect Cyril Mountfort. It was the birthplace of Rewi Alley, notable for his work in China in the mid 20th century. There is an extensive memorial dedicated to him, located in a small reserve off the main road. It includes a large stone carving and a number of panels giving details of his life.

On 15 July 2007, a statue of a giant pink doughnut was erected to promote the upcoming movie, The Simpsons Movie. It was subsequently set alight and destroyed by an arsonist on 25 September 2009. A tyre painted pink was used as a substitute until it was replaced with a concrete version unveiled on 1 July 2012.

In 2016, the start of a new subdivision called Alpine View Estate began. A new road, called Princes Street was built next to Queen and King St with a link to Victoria St.

In 2019, the town gained unwanted attention in the national and international media when the Springfield Store and Café was dubbed the rudest café in New Zealand and the police visited offering customer service advice. It is now under new ownership.

On 29 May 2021, most of the township of Springfield was evacuated due to flooding from continuous heavy rain. Bishops Gully, in the centre of the town overflowed as well as the water race. A number of properties were flooded.

Midland Line 

Springfield is a significant stop on the TranzAlpine train journey across the Southern Alps on the Midland Line. The town is also home to the Midland Rail Heritage Trust a rail preservation group that has established a base in the former NZR locomotive depot opposite the railway station. The Springfield Hotel was a stop on the road west from Christchurch for horse-drawn coaches. When trains became the usual way to travel between Canterbury and the West Coast, the train station refreshment rooms were a popular stop. 

As of 2021, the Mainline Steam Heritage Trust's Christchurch depot will be moving to the Midland Rail Heritage Trust's land and will build a new depot from there.

Demographics
It is part of the statistical area of Torlesse.

Springfield had a population of 318 at the 2018 New Zealand census, an increase of 84 people (35.9%) since the 2013 census, and an increase of 105 people (49.3%) since the 2006 census. There were 120 households. There were 171 males and 147 females, giving a sex ratio of 1.16 males per female, with 78 people (24.5%) aged under 15 years, 48 (15.1%) aged 15 to 29, 150 (47.2%) aged 30 to 64, and 39 (12.3%) aged 65 or older.

Ethnicities were 91.5% European/Pākehā, 15.1% Māori, 0.9% Pacific peoples, 1.9% Asian, and 1.9% other ethnicities (totals add to more than 100% since people could identify with multiple ethnicities).

Although some people objected to giving their religion, 63.2% had no religion, 29.2% were Christian and 1.9% had other religions.

Of those at least 15 years old, 39 (16.2%) people had a bachelor's or higher degree, and 45 (18.8%) people had no formal qualifications. The employment status of those at least 15 was that 123 (51.2%) people were employed full-time, 45 (18.8%) were part-time, and 9 (3.8%) were unemployed.

Torlesse

Torlesse had a population of 1,164 at the 2018 New Zealand census, an increase of 150 people (14.8%) since the 2013 census, and an increase of 264 people (29.3%) since the 2006 census. There were 447 households. There were 618 males and 543 females, giving a sex ratio of 1.14 males per female. The median age was 41.2 years (compared with 37.4 years nationally), with 255 people (21.9%) aged under 15 years, 174 (14.9%) aged 15 to 29, 579 (49.7%) aged 30 to 64, and 153 (13.1%) aged 65 or older.

Ethnicities were 92.8% European/Pākehā, 10.1% Māori, 0.3% Pacific peoples, 3.6% Asian, and 3.1% other ethnicities (totals add to more than 100% since people could identify with multiple ethnicities).

The proportion of people born overseas was 15.2%, compared with 27.1% nationally.

Although some people objected to giving their religion, 55.7% had no religion, 33.5% were Christian, 0.3% were Hindu and 1.5% had other religions.

Of those at least 15 years old, 138 (15.2%) people had a bachelor or higher degree, and 183 (20.1%) people had no formal qualifications. The median income was $33,600, compared with $31,800 nationally. The employment status of those at least 15 was that 489 (53.8%) people were employed full-time, 171 (18.8%) were part-time, and 18 (2.0%) were unemployed.

Government 
Springfield is part of the Selwyn Electorate. The Selwyn District Council provides local government services for Springfield.

Education
Springfield School is a contributing primary school catering for years 1 to 6.

Etymology 
There are a number of accounts where the name Springfield may have come. It may have been named after an American Civil War battlefield by J Bell in 1868. It might have also been named in a similar style to Darfield and Sheffield and the final suggestion is that the post office was named in 1870 after a spring in the field beside the local hotel.

Gallery

References

External links

Selwyn District
Populated places in Canterbury, New Zealand